The Ministry of the Interior (MI;) is the government department of East Timor accountable for internal security and related matters.

Functions
The Ministry is responsible for the design, implementation, coordination and evaluation of policies for the following areas:

 internal security;
 migration and asylum:
 border control;
 civil protection;
 road security; and
 police cooperation.

Minister
The incumbent Minister of the Interior is Taur Matan Ruak, Prime Minister of East Timor. He is assisted by António Armindo, Deputy Minister of the Interior, and Joaquim José Gusmão dos Reis Martins, Secretary of State for Civil Protection.

See also 
 List of interior ministries
 Politics of East Timor

References

Footnote

Notes

External links

  – official site  (inactive )
 

Interior
East Timor
East Timor, Interior
1975 establishments in East Timor